Pempheris is a genus of sweepers native to the Atlantic, Indian and Pacific Ocean.

Species
There are currently more than 70 recognized species in this genus:
 Pempheris adspersa Griffin, 1927 (New Zealand bigeye)
 Pempheris adusta Bleeker, 1877 (Dusky sweeper)
 Pempheris affinis McCulloch, 1911 (Black-tipped sweeper)
 Pempheris analis Waite, 1910 (Bronze sweeper)
 Pempheris andilana J. E. Randall & Victor, 2015
 Pempheris argyrea J. E. Randall & Victor, 2015
 Pempheris bexillon Mooi & J. E. Randall, 2014
 Pempheris bineeshi J. E. Randall & Victor, 2015
 Pempheris bruggemanni J. E. Randall & Victor, 2015
 Pempheris compressa (J. White, 1790) (Small-scale sweeper)
 Pempheris connelli J. E. Randall & Victor, 2015
 Pempheris convexa J. E. Randall & Victor, 2014
 Pempheris cuprea J. E. Randall & Victor, 2014
 Pempheris darvelli J. E. Randall & Victor, 2014
 Pempheris eatoni J. E. Randall & Victor, 2014
 Pempheris ellipse J. E. Randall & Victor, 2015
 Pempheris familia Koeda & Motomura, 2017
 Pempheris flavicycla J. E. Randall, Satapoomin & Alpermann, 2013
 P. f. flavicycla J. E. Randall, Satapoomin & Alpermann, 2013 (Yellow-eye sweeper)
 P. f. marisrubri J. E. Randall, Bogorodsky & Alpermann, 2013
 Pempheris gasparinii H. T. Pinheiro, Bernardi & L. A. Rocha, 2016 (Trindade sweeper)
 Pempheris hadra J. E. Randall & Victor, 2015
 Pempheris heemstraorum J. E. Randall & Victor, 2015
 Pempheris hollemani J. E. Randall & Victor, 2015
 Pempheris ibo J. E. Randall & Victor, 2015
 Pempheris japonica Döderlein (de), 1883
 Pempheris klunzingeri McCulloch, 1911 (Klunzinger's sweeper)
 Pempheris kruppi J. E. Randall, Victor & Aideed, 2015
 Pempheris kuriamuria J. E. Randall & Victor, 2015
 Pempheris leiolepis J. E. Randall & Victor, 2015
 Pempheris malabarica G. Cuvier, 1831
 Pempheris mangula G. Cuvier, 1829 (Black-edged sweeper)
 Pempheris megalops J. E. Randall & Victor, 2015
 Pempheris micromma J. E. Randall & Victor, 2015
 Pempheris molucca G. Cuvier, 1829
 Pempheris multiradiata Klunzinger, 1879 (Common sweeper)
 Pempheris muscat J. E. Randall & Victor, 2015
 Pempheris nesogallica G. Cuvier, 1831
 Pempheris nyctereutes D. S. Jordan & Evermann, 1902
 Pempheris orbis J. E. Randall & Victor, 2015
 Pempheris ornata Mooi & R. N. Jubb, 1996 (Orange-lined sweeper)
 Pempheris otaitensis G. Cuvier, 1831
 Pempheris oualensis G. Cuvier, 1831 (Silver sweeper)
 Pempheris pathirana J. E. Randall & Victor, 2015
 Pempheris peza J. E. Randall & Victor, 2015
 Pempheris poeyi T. H. Bean, 1885 (Curved sweeper)
 Pempheris rapa Mooi, 1998
 Pempheris rhomboidea Kossman & Räuber, 1877 (Dusky sweeper)
 Pempheris rochai J. E. Randall & Victor, 2015
 Pempheris rubricauda J. E. Randall & Victor, 2015
 Pempheris russellii F. Day, 1888
 Pempheris sarayu J. E. Randall & Bineesh, 2014
 Pempheris schomburgkii J. P. Müller & Troschel, 1848 (Glassy sweeper)
 Pempheris schreineri A. Miranda-Ribeiro, 1915
 Pempheris schwenkii Bleeker, 1855 (Black-stripe sweeper)
 Pempheris sergey J. E. Randall & Victor, 2015
 Pempheris shimoni J. E. Randall & Victor, 2015
 Pempheris shirleen J. E. Randall & Victor, 2015
 Pempheris smithorum J. E. Randall & Victor, 2015
 Pempheris tau J. E. Randall & Victor, 2015
 Pempheris ternay J. E. Randall & Victor, 2015
 Pempheris tilman J. E. Randall & Victor, 2015
 Pempheris tiran J. E. Randall & Victor, 2015
 Pempheris tominagai Koeda, Yoshino & Tachihara, 2014
 Pempheris trinco J. E. Randall & Victor, 2015
 Pempheris ufuagari Koeda, Yoshino & Tachihara, 2013 (Crown sweeper)
 Pempheris vanicolensis G. Cuvier, 1831 (Vanikoro sweeper)
 Pempheris viridis J. E. Randall & Victor, 2015
 Pempheris wilsoni J. E. Randall & Victor, 2015
 Pempheris xanthomma J. E. Randall & Victor, 2015
 Pempheris xanthoptera Tominaga, 1963
 Pempheris ypsilychnus Mooi & R. N. Jubb, 1996 (Ypsilon sweeper)
 Pempheris zajonzi J. E. Randall & Victor, 2015

References

 
Pempheridae
Taxa named by Georges Cuvier
Marine fish genera